Moskenes Church is a parish church of the Church of Norway in Moskenes Municipality in Nordland county, Norway. It is located in on the small Moskenes peninsula, located immediately north of the village of Sørvågen. It is one of the two churches for the Moskenes parish which is part of the Lofoten prosti (deanery) in the Diocese of Sør-Hålogaland. The white, wooden church was built in a cruciform style in 1819 using plans drawn up by the architect Kirsten Wleügel Knutssøn. The church seats about 280 people.

History
The earliest existing historical records of the church in Moskenes date back to 1589, but the church was not new that year. In 1750, the church was described as a small wooden church with a flat roof and no steeple or sacristy. It had a small cemetery with a nice stone wall around it. That church was torn down and replaced in 1819 by the present wooden, cruciform church. The new church was not consecrated until 1 August 1821.

Media gallery

See also
List of churches in Sør-Hålogaland

References

Moskenes
Churches in Nordland
Cruciform churches in Norway
Wooden churches in Norway
19th-century Church of Norway church buildings
Churches completed in 1819
16th-century establishments in Norway